Otostigmus scaber is a species of centipedes in the family Scolopendridae. The species is distributed in a large range from African Réunion, to South Asian countries towards Taiwan, Vietnam and Hawaii.

References

External links
Otostigmus scaber
Otostigmus scaber photos
Notes on the type specimens of three species of Otostigmus described from Indo-China by Carl Attems

scaber
Animals described in 1876